Jean-Baptiste Lobréau ("Citizen Lobréau" in dispatches; 1748–1822) was a French Legion of Honour soldier.

Lobréau was born 24 March 1748 in Hautvilliers, Champagna, which is present-day Marne. He was the son of Gerard Lobreau, a physician, and d'Élisabeth Macquart and married Marie Barbe Eulalie Graillet.  He entered the service as a cannonier in the 2nd artillery regiment of Metz, and fought in Corsica from 1768 to 1769; in 1769 French victory at the Battle of Ponte Novu ended Corsica's brief period of sovereignty.  Subsequently, he embarked with the squadron of Admiral D'Estaign to participate in the Yorktown Campaign in 1782 and 1783.  After fighting in the Wars against the First Coalition, in particular in northern Italy and the Rhine Campaign of 1796, during which he commanded the artillery at the siege at Kehl, he returned to France, where he supervised the construction of the fortifications of Brest.  He received the cross of the Legion of Honour.

Service
Enlisted, 27 October 1767
Promoted to Sergeant,6 October 1777, with distinction
Sergeant Major, 11 April 1782
Lieutenant 1791
Captain, 1792
Chef de Brigade (Colonel) 3rd Regiment, 1792

Notes

1748 births
1822 deaths
French military personnel of the French Revolutionary Wars
Grand Croix of the Légion d'honneur
People from Marne (department)